Pasi is a 1979 Indian Tamil-language drama film written and directed by Durai. It stars Shoba, Vijayan and Delhi Ganesh. The critically acclaimed film won two awards each at the National Film Awards, the Tamil Nadu State Film Awards, and the Filmfare Awards South. It was remade in Hindi by Durai as Pet Pyaar Aur Paap.

Plot
Muniyan, a cycle-rickshaw puller, is a road-side dweller along with his wife Valliamma and their seven children – two daughters and five sons. Despite being the sole breadwinner of his family, Manian spends the majority of his meager earnings on liquor. His wife struggles to make ends meet with the remaining amount. Her friend Rakkamma, a street food vendor, lends financial support to Valliamma's family.

The educated Krishna, one of Manian's sons, elopes with a girl and separates himself from the family. Manian's daughter Kuppamma along with her friend Chellamma contribute a small income to the family by picking up rags on the roads. Rangan, a kindhearted lorry driver, befriends Kuppamma and offers assistance to her whenever she is in need of any help. They both get close to each other and their friendship leads to a physical relationship. When Valliamma gets to know this, she commits suicide fearing that Kuppamma's act has brought disgrace to the family. Meanwhile, Kuppamma gets shocked when she learns that Rangan is already married. With an intention to not disclose Rangan's identity, she keeps herself away from him. During this time, Kuppamma finds out that she's pregnant. Despite the advice of fellow road-side dwellers to abort the child, she refuses to do so. She also protects Rangan's identity by informing her relatives that her lover had died in an accident.

Knowing that she is about to deliver their child, Kuppamma wishes to meet Rangan. But Rangan had relocated to another locality after she turned down his support. When Rangan's wife gets to know of the relationship, she empathises with Kuppamma and insists that Rangan bring her to their home. When Rangan reaches the slum, he finds Kuppamma in throes of labour pain. Kuppamma dies soon after, upon delivering their child. Rangan and his wife then decide to adopt the child as penance for Rangan's sins.

Cast

Production
The film focused on the plight of roadside dwellers. Durai, who is known for making commercial films, made Pasi in a realistic manner by compromising on commercial aspects such as songs and dance sequences. The background score was composed by Shankar–Ganesh. The Government of Tamil Nadu provided a subsidy of  100,000 for the film.

Reception
Released on 21 December 1979, the film met with unanimous critical acclaim. It was equally successful at the box-office, running for more than 100 days in the theatres. In 1984, Durai himself remade the film in Hindi as Pet Pyaar Aur Paap, starring Smita Patil and Raj Babbar.

A review from the Tamil magazine Ananda Vikatan, dated 13 January 1980, appreciated the film for its realistic depiction of the lives of the poor. It also praised Shobha's acting and Ranga's camerawork. Durai's script and dialogues received equal praise but the end credits of the film were criticised as it was considered as not being appropriate to the characters of the film. The same year it was screened at the Tashkent Film Festival. Kausigan of Kalki praised the story that makes you feel as if you are standing and watching the real life of the slum dwellers, the natural dialogues and the excellent direction of Durai and Ranga, who has skillfully navigated every corner of the slum with his camera, are worthy of praise and concluded the film satisfies the mind.

The film served as a launchpad for Senthil, who would later go onto establish himself as one of the popular comedians in Tamil cinema in the 1980s. Another debutante Sathya, who played Shobha's friend Chellamma, acquired the prefix "Pasi" after the film.

Shortly after receiving the Best Actress award at the 27th National Film Awards and a day before the 100th day celebration of the film's success, Shobha committed suicide by hanging herself at her residence in Madras (now Chennai).

Accolades
National Film Awards
 1980 – Silver Lotus Award - Best Actress - Shoba
 1980 – National Film Award for Best Feature Film in Tamil

Filmfare Awards South
 1979 – Best Tamil Film (Durai)
 1979 – Best Tamil Actress (Shobha)

Tamil Nadu State Film Awards
 1980 – Best Film (first prize) (G. Lalitha)
 1980 – Special Prize for Best Actor (Delhi Ganesh)

References

Bibliography

External links
 

1979 films
Films about poverty in India
Films featuring a Best Actress National Award-winning performance
Films set in Chennai
1970s Tamil-language films
Films scored by Shankar–Ganesh
Tamil films remade in other languages
Best Tamil Feature Film National Film Award winners
Films directed by Durai